, known by her stage name Aiko, (stylized as aiko) is a Japanese singer and songwriter. She is most famous for her hit songs Ashita, Kabutomushi, Hanabi, Sakura no Toki, Boyfriend, and Kira Kira.

Music career 
In April 1996, Aiko became a radio host of FM Osaka after graduating from college. She released a CD which she produced independently with her friends of college in August. She participated in "The 5th Music Quest Japan Final" on 10 October, and was awarded the Excellence Award shared with Ringo Shiina. She released an EP on an independent label in 1997, followed by a single and a mini-album in 1998.

In July 1998, Aiko debuted on a major label with her first single, Ashita (あした; "Tomorrow"), which was used as the theme song for the movie Toire no Hanako-san.

In 2000, her second album, Sakura no Ki no Shita (桜の木の下; "Under the Cherry Blossom Tree"), reached number one in the Oricon weekly charts, with the total CD sales amounting to 1.4 million copies. Her sixth single, Boyfriend, sold over 500,000 copies and became her best-selling CD single. She made her first appearance in NHK's 2000 Kohaku Uta Gassen.

Discography

 Chiisa na Marui Koujitsu (小さな丸い好日; Little Calm Good Day) (1999) 
 Sakura no Ki no Shita (桜の木の下; Under the Cherry Blossom Tree) (2000)
 Natsufuku (夏服; Summer Clothing) (2001)
 Aki Soba ni Iru yo (秋 そばにいるよ; Autumn is Beside Me) (2002)
 Akatsuki no Love Letter (暁のラブレター; Love Letter of Daybreak) (2003)
 Yume no Naka no Massugu na Michi (夢の中のまっすぐな道; The Straight Ahead Path in a Dream) (2005)
 Kanojo (彼女; Girlfriend) (2006)
 Himitsu (秘密; Secret) (2008)
 Baby (2010)
 Toki no Silhouette (時のシルエット; Silhouette of Time) (2012)
 Awa no You na Ai Datta (泡のような愛だった; It was a Love Like Foam) (2014)
 May Dream (2016)
 Shimetta Natsu no Hajimari (湿った夏の始まり; Beginning of a Humid Summer) (2018)
 Doushitatte Tsutaerarenaikara (どうしたって伝えられないから; I Can’t Tell You Why) (2021)

Performances

Tours
 "Love Like Pop" (1998, 1999, 2000, 2001, 2002, 2004, 2005, 2006, 2008, 2009, 2010, 2011, 2012, 2013, 2014, 2015) 
 College musical festivals (1999, 2003; 7 places in all)
 "Baby Peenats Meeting" (2001, 2004; fan club members only)
 "Love Like Rock" (2002, 2003, 2006, 2007, 2017 (fan club members only), 2009; no-seat concerts, 2011, 2013, 2015 at Zepp Tokyo)
 "Love Like Aloha" (Summer 2003, at Katase beach, Enoshima; Summer 2006 and 2008, at Southern Beach, Chigasaki, 2012 and 2015)

Appearances

Shorts
 Japanese manga artist Yukari Ichijo based the character "Eiko", in Pride (2002–2010) on Aiko, and Aiko has several times expressed admiration for Ichijo.
 Aiko also sang the insert song "KissHug" for the movie Hana Yori Dango Final which premiered on 28 June 2008 and "Mukai Awase" for the 2010 comedy film My Darling is a Foreigner.

Radio
Aiko has presented several regular radio programs, including local radio programmes in the Kansai area before she achieved widespread fame in July 1998.
 Count Down Kansai Top40 (FM Osaka, April 1996 – December 2001)
 Poppun Kingdom (MBS, April 1997 – ?)
 Young Town Music Max (MBS, October 1997 – September 1999)
 Baby Peanuts (FM Osaka, October 1998 – ?)
 Aiko's @llnightnippon.com (NBS, November 1999 – March 2003), containing the popular musical feature Sing! Aiko.

Works

Books
 "Aiko Bon" (2005) was the first official book about Aiko. The book contains her autobiography (in an interview style), photos, feature articles from monthly magazine GbMusicnet and liner notes by herself.

Awards

References

External links
  

 (Oricon top 20,000 subscribers' 2005) : '05好きなアーティストランキング – Oricon Style ミュージック & 06'好きなアーティストランキング『音楽ファン2万人に聞いた好きなアーティストとは？！』-Oricon Style ミュージック.

1975 births
Living people
People from Suita
Japanese women pop singers
Japanese women singer-songwriters
Japanese radio personalities
Pony Canyon artists
20th-century Japanese women singers
20th-century Japanese singers
21st-century Japanese women singers
21st-century Japanese singers